Haemodorum distichophyllum, also known as the Moorland Bloodroot, is a plant in the Haemodoraceae (blood root) family, native to Tasmania. It was first described by William Jackson Hooker in 1852, from a specimen collected at Macquarie Harbour by Ronald Gunn in 1846.

It is a very low growing plant, growing to heights of 3 cm to 9.5 cm.  It is found in heath and button grass plains of western Tasmania at various altitudes.

References

External links
Haemodorum distichophyllum: Images & occurrence data from GBIF.

distichophyllum
Flora of Tasmania
Taxa named by William Jackson Hooker
Plants described in 1852